Fadil Sausu (born 19 April 1985) is an Indonesian professional footballer who plays as a central midfielder for and captains Liga 1 club Bali United. He started his debut when joined junior club Persisam Putra Samarinda in 2006.

Club career
Fadil was recruited by Persik Kediri to play in the 2008–09 Indonesia Super League.

After a season with Persik Kediri, Fadil was called by Fachry Husaini to joined Bontang FC. He joined Bontang FC for 2 seasons before moving to Mitra Kukar.

International career
He made his international debut for senior team on 4 October 2017, against Cambodia.

Honours

Club
Bali United
 Liga 1: 2019, 2021–22

Individual 
 Liga 1 Team of the Season: 2019
 Indonesian Soccer Awards: Best Footballer 2019
Indonesian Soccer Awards: Best 11 2019

References

External links
 
 

1985 births
Living people
People from Palu
Indonesian footballers
Indonesia international footballers
Indonesian Premier League players 
Liga 1 (Indonesia) players
Bontang F.C. players
Mitra Kukar players
Persik Kediri players
PSTK Tarakan players
Association football fullbacks
Association football wingers
Sportspeople from Central Sulawesi
Bali United F.C. players